Batman: The Animated Series is an American television series produced by Warner Bros. Animation that is based on the DC Comics superhero Batman. Originally, the show aired 85 episodes on Fox from 1992-1995, but was later continued as The New Batman Adventures on The WB and aired 24 episodes. Both series have since aired together on various other networks, including Cartoon Network, Boomerang, Jetix, and The Hub. Including commercials, each episode is about 22 minutes long.

The series is part of what has become known as the DC Animated Universe, which consists of eight animated television shows and six animated films, largely surrounding DC Comics characters and their respective mythos.

Series overview

Episodes
Note: This article lists the episodes in their DVD release order, rather than by their original air dates, because the original air dates were severely out of their production order.

Season 1 (1992–1993)
 65 episodes were produced for Season One, due to it being the minimum number of episodes necessary for a TV series to be successfully syndicated. 60 of these episodes were initially aired during the 1992–1993 television season, which ran from September 1992 to May 1993. The final five episodes of Season One were held back until September 17, 1993.
 Episodes 1 to 28 were released on DVD in the Batman: The Animated Series Volume One set; episodes 29 to 56 in the Volume Two set; and episodes 57 to 85 in the Volume Three set.

Season 2 (1994–1995)
Because of the success the show was enjoying, the Fox network executives ordered a second season of 20 more episodes while the 65 episodes of the first season were still airing. Season Two featured Robin more prominently, and eleven out of the 20 episodes were given the onscreen title The Adventures of Batman & Robin.

After airing five of the 20 episodes in May 1994, the network reduced the series to airing only weekly on Saturday mornings. Ten more episodes were broadcast in this format in September–November 1994 under the Adventures of Batman & Robin title. Once these fifteen episodes had premiered (the final five were held back until September 1995), the weekday slot was restored to include reruns of the entire series, with all previous episodes being shown under the new title for all remaining airings on Fox, as well as several VHS releases.

The entirety of Season Two was released on DVD as part of the Batman: The Animated Series Volume Three set alongside the final nine episodes of Season One.

Season 3 (1997–1999)

See also
 Batman: Mask of the Phantasm
 Batman & Mr. Freeze: SubZero
 Batman: Mystery of the Batwoman
 List of The New Batman Adventures episodes

References

 Cinefantastique, Vol. 24, #6/Vol. 25, #1, February 1994 (special double-issue, with multiple articles on the Fox Network run).

External links
 

 
Batman: The Animated Series
Batman: The Animated Series episodes
Batman: The Animated Series
Batman